Line 20 of the Beijing Subway, or Line R4 (Chinese: 北京地铁R4线; pinyin: běijīng dìtiě R sì xiàn) is a rapid transit line under planning in Beijing.

The first phase of Line 20 will be 19 km in length with 4 stations. It is expected to open in 2028. There will be through service between Line 3 and Line 20.

Stations (Phase 1)

History
In 2019, Liu Xuesong, representative of the Beijing Municipal People's Congress and general manager of Capital Airport Holding, suggested building the northern section of the line in advance. 

On November 10, 2020, the Shunyi Branch of the Beijing Municipal Planning and Natural Resources Commission released a notice to advance the preliminary work of rail transit, including the Shunyi section of Line 20.

According to the information released on January 11, 2022, the first phase of the line is included in the "Beijing Rail Transit Phase III Construction Plan".

References

Beijing Subway lines
Proposed public transport in China
Proposed buildings and structures in Beijing